According to the Book of Mormon, Gideon was a faithful Nephite leader, a strong man, and an enemy to King Noah. After King Noah's expulsion and death by fire, Gideon counseled with Noah's son, King Limhi.  He proposed a plan for escaping from Lamanite bondage. Gideon grew to be an old man, and was killed by Nehor. After his death, a city of the Nephites was named after him.

References

Book of Mormon people